The decathlon was a men's event and part of the Athletics at the 1964 Summer Olympics program in Tokyo.  It was held on 19 October and 20 October 1964.    23 athletes from 15 nations entered and 22 started the first event.

Results

First day

100 metres

Long jump

Shot put

Storozhenko moved from fourth place to first with his performance in the shot put, as Thomas dropped from the lead to eighth.

High jump

Wu dropped out of contention after three events, not competing in the high jump.

400 metres

Storozhenko, leading after four, finished last in the 400 metres, falling to fifth place.

First day rankings
 Willi Holdorf, 4090 points
 Hans-Joachim Walde, 4074 points
 Rein Aun, 4067 points
 Horst Beyer, 3910 points
 Mykhaylo Storozhenko, 3908 points
 Paul Irvin Herman, 3876 points
 Werner Duttweiler, 3837 points
 Russ Hodge, 3813 points
 Yang Chuan Kwang, 3803 points
 Vasili Kuznetsov, 3793 points
 Richard John Emberger, 3719 points
 Hector Thomas, 3704 points
 Valbjoern Thorlaksson, 3640 points
 Alois Buchel, 3631 points
 Bill Gairdner, 3568 points
 Eef Kamerbeek, 3522 points
 Franco Sar, 3454 points
 Suzuki Shosuke, 3415 points
 Koech Kiprop, 3288 points
 Dramane Sereme, 3277 points
 Gerry Moro, 3261 points
 Wu Ar Min, 1734 points (withdrew)
 Samir Ambrose Vincent, 0 points (withdrew)

Second day

110 metre hurdles

Kamerbeek became the second decathlete to drop out.

Discus throw

Pole vault

Duttweiler and Thomas both dropped out before the pole vault.  Yang continued to advance, and Herman and Kuznetsov also moved into position to challenge for medals, while Beyer dropped out of contention into 8th place.  Holdorf's lead grew to almost 130 points, almost unassailable, and nearly as many as the 150 that separated 2nd from 5th places.

Javelin throw

In the javelin throw, Yang won another event, moving up to fourth place.  Holdorf fared poorly, his lead shrinking to 60 points, but with Walde increasing to 67 points ahead of Aun in third place, a German gold medal was nearly assured and the top pair was looking quite likely.  In contrast, Yang was only 23 points behind Aun in an effort to knock the Soviet off the medal platform.  Kuznetsov was still only a point behind Yang and Herman was not far from them either.

1500 metres

The final event was the 1500 metres.  Emberger was the fastest in the event, but still finished in 10th place overall.  Aun, with a 67-point deficit to catch Walde for the silver medal, needed to run approximately 10 seconds faster than the German.  His 4:22.3 was more than enough to beat Walde's 4:37.5, giving Aun 100 more points than Walde and the silver medal.  Yang and Kuznetsov, who had been threatening to join the medalists, each dropped in the rankings after the 1500.

Final standings

References

External links
Official Olympic Report, la84.org.

Decathlon
1964
Men's events at the 1964 Summer Olympics